Uberaba is a city in the state of Minas Gerais, southeast Brazil. The city status was granted in 1856, and its name comes from the Tupi language meaning "bright water". As of 2021 the population was 340,277 inhabitants.

History
The history of Uberaba begins in 1810 when capt. Major Eustaquio founded a settlement in the vicinity of the ancient route of Anhanguera (also known as the 'Goyazes road') to serve as a stopping point for locals and travelers during the 19th century. Given the strategic location of the village and as a crossroads, local farmers started to cultivate crops and domesticate cattle for commerce which led the establishment of a strong livestock network for that region.

The territory of Uberaba was part of the Captaincy of Goias until 1816, being annexed to the Captaincy of Minas Gerais in the same year. It was raised to parish in 1820 then formally named as a city in 1856.  

The first rail station was built in 1889 due to the expansions of Mogiana Railway from the municipality of Sacramento, increasing local economy in the following years.  

Today, the city holds events of livestock and agribusiness. As an industrial hub, Uberaba is a regional center of culture, and business. It is home to numerous institutions, marketplaces, and entertainment venues.

The municipality also comprises the district of Peirópolis, a palaeontological site located in the rural area of the city, holding the Palaeontological Research Center – Llewellyn Ivor Price (pt: Centro de Pesquisas Paleontológicas – Llewellyn Ivor Price) and a museum dedicated to the fossils found in the area. It was named in honor of the Brazilian paleontologist Llewellyn Price.

Geography

Climate 
Uberaba's climate is Tropical (Aw). The average temperature for the year is 21.9 °C (71.4 °F). The highest recorded temperature is 40.2 °C (105.2 °F) which was recorded in October. The lowest recorded temperature is −2.2 °C (28.0 °F) recorded in July. 

There are an average of 86 days of precipitation with the most occurring in December, and the least occurring in July.

Demographics 
Uberaba is the main municipality in the Intermediate Geographic Region of Uberaba.

In 2021, the Immediate Geographic Region of Uberaba consisted of 10 municipalities within an area of 14.281,652 km² (5514,17 sq mi).

 Água Comprida
 Campo Florido
 Conceição das Alagoas
 Conquista
 Delta
 Nova Ponte
 Sacramento
 Santa Juliana
 Uberaba
 Veríssimo

Economy
Uberaba is one of the largest producers of grain in the state. The top agricultural products are corn, soybean, coffee, cotton, and sugarcane. The city also holds the ‘’Expozebu’’, one of the largest cattle fair in the world taking place every May. 

The service sector employs just over half the population living in the city, followed by manufacturing industry, and agriculture in third place. Industrial sector include agribusiness, food processing, clothing, steel, mining, chemical products, electronic devices, home appliances, and more.

The industrial park currently hosts processing plants operated by chemical companies such as Vale S.A., FMC Corporation, Sipcam Nichino (UPL), and Yara. 

Cargo is transported to other cities by road, and rail.

Agriculture: crops planted (2006)
Bananas: 28 ha.
Coffee: 1,000 ha.
Oranges: 1,410 ha.
Tangerine: 168 ha.
Cotton: 3,145 ha.
Rice: 543 ha.
Peanuts: 100 ha.
Potatoes: 2,190 ha.
Sugarcane: 36,000 ha.
Onions: 450 ha.
Beans: 1,450 ha.
Cassava: 1,300 ha.
Corn: 50,000 ha.
Soybeans: 100,000 ha.
Sorghum: 1,250
Tomatoes: 240 ha.
Wheat: 336 ha.

Farming (2006) 

 Number of farms: 1,093
 Agricultural area: 282,692 ha.
 Planted area: 105,000 ha.
 Area of natural pasture: 112,678
 Workers related to producer: 1,764
 Workers not related to producer: 2,533

Transportation 
Uberaba is served by Mário de Almeida Franco Airport.

Notable people
 Alfredo Moser, inventor.
 João Menezes, tennis player.
 Yuu Kamiya, artist.

Popular culture 
Uberaba is also famous for being the home of the philanthropist and spiritualist medium Chico Xavier. Chico was born in Pedro Leopoldo in 1910, living in Uberaba from 1959 until his death at the age of 92 on June 30, 2002. He is buried in the city.

Sister cities 

  Goiânia, Goiás,  Brazil.
  Reynosa, Tamaulipas, Mexico.
  Hyderabad, Telangana, India.

References

External links
City Hall of Uberaba website
Government of the State of Minas Gerais website

 
Populated places established in 1809
1809 establishments in Brazil
Municipalities in Minas Gerais